In vector calculus, Chandrasekhar–Wentzel lemma was derived by Subrahmanyan Chandrasekhar and Gregor Wentzel in 1965, while studying the stability of rotating liquid drop. The lemma states that if  is a surface bounded by a simple closed contour , then

An immediate consequence is that if  is a closed surface, then the line integral tends to zero, leading to the result,

or, in index notation, we have

That is to say the tensor

defined on a closed surface is always symmetric, i.e., .

Proof

Let us write the vector in index notation, but summation convention will be avoided throughout the proof. Then the left hand side can be written as

Converting the line integral to surface integral using Stokes's theorem, we get

Carrying out the requisite differentiation and after some rearrangement, we get

or, in other words,

And since , we have

thus proving the lemma.

References

Vector calculus